Little Miss Barber was an advertising character and trademark for a number of brands of tea, including  Barber's, Orantips and Twinings, in the English West Midlands, several examples of which remain visible on ghost signs in the region.

The character was in use at least as early as January 1929. In 1942, she was used to promote a Toc H charity concert at Birmingham Town Hall. The character was in use as late as July 1956 at least, when she was featured in an advertising competition whose results were announced on I.T.V. television by Daphne Padell.

References

External links 

  - Appears in very first frames after opening credits.

Tea brands in the United Kingdom
Drink advertising characters
Female characters in advertising
Fictional characters introduced in 1945
Ghost signs
History of the West Midlands (county)